LibreOffice Writer is the free and open-source word processor and desktop publishing component of the LibreOffice software package and is a fork of OpenOffice.org Writer. Writer is a word processor similar to Microsoft Word and Corel's WordPerfect with many similar features, and file format compatibility.

LibreOffice Writer is released under the Mozilla Public License v2.0.

As with the entire LibreOffice suite, Writer can be used across a variety of platforms, including Linux, FreeBSD, macOS and Microsoft Windows. There are community builds for many other platforms. Ecosystem partner Collabora uses LibreOffice upstream code and provides apps for Android, iOS, iPadOS and ChromeOS. LibreOffice Online is an online office suite which includes the applications Writer, Calc and Impress and provides an upstream for projects such as commercial Collabora Online.

Some features 
 Writer is capable of opening and saving to a number of formats, including OpenDocument (ODT is its default format), Microsoft Word's DOC, DOCX, RTF and XHTML.
 A spelling and grammar checker (Hunspell)
 Built-in drawing tools
 Built-in form building tools
 Built-in calculation functions
 Built-in equation editor
 Export in PDF format, generate hybrid PDF (a standard PDF with attached source ODF file) and create fillable PDF form
 The ability to import and edit PDF files.
 Ability to edit HTML, XHTML files visually without using code with WYSIWYG support
 Export in HTML, XHTML, XML formats
 Export in EPUB ebook format
 Contents, index, bibliography
 Document signing, password and public-key (GPG) encryption
 Change tracking during revisions, document comparison (view changes between two files)
 Database integration, including a bibliography database
 MailMerge
 Scriptable and Remote Controllable via the UNO API
 OpenType stylistic sets and character variants of fonts are not selectable from the menus, but can be specified manually in the font window. For example, fontname:ss06&cv03 will set the font to stylistic set 6 and chose character variant 3. This is based on the same syntax for Graphite font feature.

Supported file formats

Release history 
Versions for LibreOffice Writer include the following:

See also 

 LibreOffice Calc
 Comparison of office suites
 Comparison of word processors
 List of word processors

References

External links

 Features page at LibreOffice.org

Cross-platform free software
Free word processors
Writer
Linux word processors
MacOS word processors
Windows word processors